Charles Noguès (13 August 1876 – 20 April 1971) was a French general. He graduated from the École Polytechnique, and he was awarded the Grand Croix of the Legion of Honour in 1939.

Biography 

On 20 March 1933, he became commander of the 19th Army Corps (France), the French Army's forces in French Algeria. 

During World War II, he served as Resident-General in Morocco and Commander-in-Chief in French North Africa. Noguès was appalled by news that the French government was seeking an armistice with Germany. On 17 June 1940 he telegraphed to Bordeaux, where the government was then situated: "The whole of North Africa is appalled. The troops beg to continue the struggle if the government has no objection. I am ready to take responsibility for this attitude with all the risks that it entails," i.e. asking for a hint to carry on fighting. However, he did not approve of General Charles de Gaulle's call from London on 18 June to carry on fighting, telling the British liaison officer that he thought de Gaulle's attitude "unseemly" and forbidding the North African press from publishing de Gaulle's appeal.

Noguès accepted the armistice on 22 June, partly (he claimed) because Admiral François Darlan would not let him have the French fleet to continue hostilities against the Axis powers. He eventually agreed under pressure from Maxime Weygand's emissary General Louis Koeltz, telegraphing Weygand: "it covers me with shame".

In 1940, Résident Général Charles Noguès implemented antisemitic decrees coming from Nazi-controlled Vichy government excluding Jews from public functions. Sultan Mohammed V refused "Vichy’s plan to ghettoize and deport Morocco’s quarter of a million Jews to the killing factories of Europe;" however, the French government under Noguès did impose some antisemitic laws against the sultan's will. Leon Sultan, of the Moroccan Communist Party, for example, was disbarred.

Nogues was critical of movements in Morocco for reforms in colonial administration. Nogues was of the belief that Moroccan reformers pursued independence and would not be satisfied with liberal reforms in France's colonial administration.

When the Allies landed in North Africa on 8 November 1942, he ordered the troops under his command to resist, until the conclusion three days later of the ceasefire, ordered by Admiral Darlan. In June 1943, he resigned from his position as Resident General of France in Morocco. Replaced by Gabriel Puaux, he retired to Portugal.

In 1947, he was sentenced in absentia to 20 years of forced labor. Charles Noguès returned to France in June 1954 where he became a prisoner, but was released immediately afterwards.

References

Book
 Lacouture, Jean. De Gaulle: The Rebel 1890–1944 (1984; English ed. 1991),

External links

 

1876 births
1971 deaths
People from Hautes-Pyrénées
People convicted of treason against France
École Polytechnique alumni
French collaborators with Nazi Germany
French military personnel of World War II
French generals
Grand Croix of the Légion d'honneur